Donald or Don Clarke may refer to:

 Donald Henderson Clarke (1887–1958), American writer and journalist
 Donald Clarke (GC) (1923–1942), British recipient of the George Cross
 Donald Clarke (cricketer) (born 1926), English cricketer
 Don Clarke (1933–2002), New Zealand rugby union player

 Donald Clarke (writer) (born 1940), American writer on music
 Don R. Clarke (born 1945), general authority of the Church of Jesus Christ of Latter-day Saints
 Donald C. Clarke, American expert on Chinese law

See also
 Don Clark (disambiguation)